The Queensland Railways A14 class locomotive was a class of 4-4-0 steam locomotives operated by the Queensland Railways.

History
In 1894/95, the Phoenix Engine Company, Ipswich built eight 4-4-0 steam locomotives for the Queensland Railways. Per Queensland Railway's classification system they were designated the A14 class, A representing they had two driving axles, and the 14 the cylinder diameter in inches.

All were reboilered in 1909 and withdrawn between 1922 and 1929.

Class list

References

Railway locomotives introduced in 1894
A14
3 ft 6 in gauge locomotives of Australia
4-4-0 locomotives